Kdo byl kdo (in English, "Who was who") is the name of two major  encyclopedic works in Czech, published as books, CD-ROMs and also available online. Their publisher is Libri.

 Kdo byl kdo v našich dějinách ve 20. století (Who was who in our history in 20th century):   volume 1, 467 pages,  volume 2, 482 pages
 Milan Churaň et al.: Kdo byl kdo v našich dějinách do roku 1918 (Who was who in our history until 1918): , 572 pages.

Among other books in the "Kdo byl kdo" edition are 
 Kdo byl kdo - proslulí návštěvníci (Who was who - Famous visitors): , 516 pages.
 Kdo byl kdo - slavní vojevůdci (Who was who - Famous commanders):  , 333 pages.
 Kdo byl kdo v našich dějinách - komplet: complete edition in three volumes, .
 A database providing the biographical data sorted by date (Kalendárium).

The encyclopedia covering the period until 1918 contains biographies of about 800 people notable in the history of Czech and Slovak lands. Short information is provided about another 1,000 people. The encyclopedia for the 20th century contains biographies of over 1,200 people and short information about 2,000 others.

The main target market of the works is schools.

See also
Who's Who

References

Biographical dictionaries
Czech online encyclopedias
Czech encyclopedias